St John Street is a main north-south street located in the city of Launceston, Tasmania. St John Street starts at the Esplanade (former Queens Wharf) and runs roughly SSE for 1.8 km to where it terminates on Howick Street on the border with South Launceston. St John Street serves as one of two 'high streets' in the city and runs past many of the city's most iconic and important buildings. The street is notably broken twice in its southernmost length between Frankland and Howick Street where the street runs over a ridge whereby the terrain was too steep for vehicular traffic to use safely resulting in portions of the street being utilized as pedestrian only reserves and only accessible to vehicles via French Street.

Important landmarks
St John Street runs past many of Launceston's most iconic and historically significant buildings and landmarks including:
 Commissariat Store
 Cornwall Square Transit Center
 City Hall
 Telstra Exchange
 Post Office
 Civic Square
 St Andrew's Kirk
 Public Chambers
 Myers Building (former Cox Bros Department Store)
 Former Mercury Building
 Quadrant Mall
 Crabtree's Chambers
 Launceston Synagogue
 Prince's Square
 St John's Church and rectory
 Chalmers Church and Hall
 Nelumie House

Major intersections
 Esplanade
 Cimitier Street
 Cameron Street
 Patterson Street
 Brisbane Street
 York Street
 Elizabeth Street
 Frederick Street
 Canning Street
 Balfour Street
 Frankland Street
 French Street
 Howick Street

See also

References

Roads in Tasmania
Launceston, Tasmania